Ulipur is an upazila of Kurigram District in the Rangpur Division, Bangladesh.

Geography
It has 63216 households and total area 504.19 km2.

Demographics
As of the 2011 Bangladesh census, Ulipur has a population of 410890. Males and females each constitute 50% of the population. The adult population, consisting of individuals over the age of 18, is 153,939. Ulipur has an average literacy rate of 45.06% (7+ years), compared to the national average of 32.4%.

Administration
Ulipur Upazila is divided into Ulipur Municipality and 13 union parishads: Bazra, Begumgonj, Buraburi, Daldalia, Dhamsreni, Dharanibari, Durgapur, Gunaigas, Hatia, Pandul, Shahabiar Alga, Tobockpur, and Thetrai. The union parishads are subdivided into 147 mauzas and 354 villages.

Ulipur Municipality is subdivided into 9 wards and 16 mahallas.

Education

According to Banglapedia, Bakshiganj Rajibia High School, founded in 1945, Durgapur High School (1914), Ulipur Government Girls' High School (1909), and Ulipur M.S. High School & College (1864) are notable secondary schools.

See also
Upazilas of Bangladesh
Districts of Bangladesh
Divisions of Bangladesh

References

Upazilas of Kurigram District